Adriana Ivancich was an Italian noble woman and poet. She was also known for her romantic relationship with the writer Ernest Hemingway.

Biography 
Adriana Ivancich met Hemingway in 1948 when she was 18 and the writer nearly 50. In spite of being married, Hemingway fell in love with her, spending time with her in Venice and Cuba. They met for the last time in Italy in May 1954.

Ivancich inspired the figure of Renata in Hemingway's 1950 novel Across the River and into the Trees, which was set in Venice. She provided illustrations for the cover of that book as well as for the 1952 first edition of The Old Man and the Sea.

In 1953, Ivancich published a collection of her own poems, Ho guardato il cielo e la terra (Mondadori), with Hemingway's enthusiastic support. In 1980, she published her own account of her time with Hemingway, La Torre Bianca. In 1983, she committed suicide.

Selected works
 Adriana Ivancich, Ho guardato il cielo e la terra Milan, Mondadori, 1953.
 Adriana Ivancich, La Torre Bianca, Milan, Mondadori, 1980.
 Andrea di Robilant, Autumn in Venice: Ernest Hemingway and His Last Muse, New York, Knopf, 2018

References

Works cited

Writers from Venice
Ernest Hemingway
1930 births
1983 suicides
Muses
20th-century Italian poets
Italian women poets
20th-century Italian women writers
Suicides in Italy